XPLM Publisher is a commercial authoring and publishing software developed and sold by XPLM. It combines the Oxygen XML Editor with Oracle Agile PLM and helps technical writers to create, manage, and publish technical product documentation (e.g., user guides) invarious formats and layouts. The XPLM Publisher follows the Darwin Information Typing Architecture (DITA) and the methods of single source publishing. This allows the same source content to be (re-)used across multiple forms of media and more than one time.

The main aspect of the XPLM Publisher is the tight integration with a PLM system as content management system and "single source of truth". Thus the technical writers are only provided with always valid and released engineering information.

References

External links
 XPLM product list

Publishing software